Pleurotomella tippetti is a species of sea snail, a marine gastropod mollusk in the family Raphitomidae.

Description

Distribution
This species occurs off the South Orkneys

References

Further reading

tippetti
Gastropods described in 2016